Kappa Theta Pi (also known as KTP) is a co-ed professional fraternity specializing in the field of information technology. Kappa Theta Pi was founded on January 10, 2012, in Ann Arbor, Michigan, and is the University of Michigan's first and only professional technology fraternity. The goals of the fraternity are to create bonds between students of Informatics, computer science, business, design, computer engineering, Information, and any others who are interested in technology, to develop networks through facilitation of professional and social growth, and to expose members to career options in the technology field.

History

Foundation
In December 2011, two students, Louise Vongphrachanh and Jing Guo, founded a professional fraternity aimed towards informatics students. As many of these students were often in multiple classes together, a fraternity was organized to foster both professional and social relationships. After gaining support and conducting interviews, a group of seven Informatics students became the founding class and first executive board. These seven individuals are:

 Nisha Dwivedi
 Jacqueline Fontaine
 Jing Guo
 Brian Mansfield
 Denny Tsai
 Julie Varghese
 Louise Vongphrachanh

Vongphrachanh and Guo signed the charter and became co-presidents of the fraternity. Later, the fraternity's focus was broadened to include all students interested in information technology. Although the fraternity is aimed towards information technology, Kappa Theta Pi has made continuous efforts to connect with students regardless of their technical and academic backgrounds.

In Spring 2014, University of Michigan School of Information formally sponsored the fraternity.

Colors
The Colors of this professional fraternity are blue (#458FFF) and green (#19FF19). The hexadecimal color values represent the technical roots of the fraternity.

Purpose
According to Kappa Theta Pi's constitution, the purpose of the fraternity can be detailed in six statements: Kappa Theta Pi works to build an active community of students with a shared interest in technology; it sponsors events and activities aimed toward intellectual, social, and professional development; it provides academic and professional resources to members; it fosters relationships among the local community, and with corporations; it provides service and philanthropy to the local community; and it works to maintain lifelong cooperation and friendship among its members.

Structure
The executive board of Kappa Theta Pi currently consists of the President, Vice President of External Affairs, Vice President of Internal Affairs, Vice President of Finance, Vice President of Engagement, Vice President of Membership, Vice President of Marketing, Vice President of Professional Development, and Vice President of Technical Development. Elections for each Executive Board position occurs at the beginning of every calendar year. Each active member of the fraternity is required to complete community service hours as well as attend professional development events. There are committees dedicated to fostering the growth and development of the fraternity. Each member must be part of a committee to actively contribute to the fraternity as a whole.

Philanthropy
Currently, Kappa Theta Pi co-hosts the Computer Science Bootcamp & Tutoring Program at Pioneer High School with Michigan CSE Scholars. Fraternity members volunteer their time to tutor high school computer science students. The primary goal of the Computer Science Bootcamp program is to successfully get all students in the class to pass the AP Computer Science exam. Furthermore, the Computer Science & Tutoring Program aims to raise diversity and appreciation for the field of computer science. Members are required to complete 10 hours of service a semester, many of which are completed with Computer Science Bootcamp. Members are also required to participate in multiple professional development events each semester; ranging from resume critiques, company presentations, and mock interviews.

Chapters
The fraternity lists eleven current chapters formed since it emerged in 2012. Active chapters noted in bold, inactive chapters noted in italics.

Rush and Pledging
Kappa Theta Pi's process for membership follows standard Greek rush and pledge guidelines. The fraternity's rush process occurs in both Fall and Winter semesters.

See also

 Professional fraternities and sororities

References

Fraternities and sororities in the United States
2012 establishments in Michigan
Student organizations established in 2012